Do Dangeh (also romanized as Do Dāngeh) is a village in Estarabad-e Jonubi Rural District, in the Central District of Gorgan County, Golestan Province, Iran. During the 2006 census, its population was 778, in 210 families.

References 

Populated places in Gorgan County